Wallbrook may refer to:

Places
Wallbrook, Dudley in the West Midlands, England
Wallbrook Primary School in Coseley, West Midlands, England

Fiction
Wallbrook, a fictitious mental institution in the 1988 American drama film Rain Man

See also
Walbrook (disambiguation)